Marek Stachowski may refer to:
 Marek Stachowski (composer)
 Marek Stachowski (linguist)